Main Khudiram Bose Hun ( I'm
khudiram bose) is a 2017 Indian Hindi-language biographical film about Indian revolutionary leader Khudiram Bose from West Bengal. Young theatre artiste, Kanishk Kumar Jain to play Bengal teenage rebel, Khudiram Bose.

Synopsis
Main Khudiram Bose Hoon is a film about Mednipur born Khudiram Bose who was hanged at the age of 18. Khudiram, a teenage student became a martyr by walking on the path of revolution. This freedom fighter would plant bombs near police stations and attack government officials. Eventually, he was arrested on the charges of conducting a series of bomb attacks. The specific bombing for which he was sentenced to death resulted in the deaths of 3 persons.

Cast
 Kanishk Kumar Jain as Khudiram Bose
 Sushant Sahni as Prafulla Chaki
 Rituparna Sengupta as Aprupa Devi (Sister of Khudram).
 Imran Hasnee as Amrutlal 
 Balendra Singh Balu as Hemchandra Kanungo	
 Rajan Gour as Satyendra Nath Bose
 Ajit Khare as Lalit (Aprupa's son)
 Kanchan Awasthi as Nanibala
 Roopa Ganguly as Sarojini 
 Akhilesh Jain as Advovate
 Azhan Hashmi as Rafeeq
 Megha Joshi as Rafeeq's Wife 
 Amitabh Shukla as Sarojini's Son
 Vijay Jorha as Arvindo Ghosh
 Charles Thomson as Collector Woodman
 Vishal Dubey as Upendranath 
 Mayank Pandey as Kalichanran
 Virendra Mishra as Varindra Ghosh
 R. Bhakti Klein as Kingsford

References

External links
 
 
 Main Khudiram Bose Hun at midnapore.in

Films set in the Indian independence movement
2010s Hindi-language films
2010s biographical films
Films set in 1908
Indian biographical films